Pickup, pick-up or pick up may refer to:

Technology

Pickup truck or pick-up truck, a light truck with an open-top rear cargo area
Pickup (music technology), an electromagnetic device which detects vibrations from a musical instrument
Pickup tube, a type of cathode ray tube
Magnetic pickup, an electromagnetic device returning electrical pulses generated by rotating gears
Phonograph pickup, a transducer used for the playback of gramophone records on a turntable or phonograph
 Pickup forceps, a handheld, hinged instrument used for grasping and holding objects

Music
Pick-up notes or anacrusis, note or sequence of notes which precedes the first downbeat in a bar
Pickup group or pickup band, a musical ensemble brought together for only a few performances
PICK-UP (band), a Ukrainian alternative rock band
"Pickup" (song), by MacKenzie Porter

Film
 Pick-Up (1933 film), a crime film starring Sylvia Sidney and George Raft
 Pickup (1951 film), an American film noir directed by Hugo Haas
 Pick-Up (1975 film), an exploitation film directed by Bernard Hirschenson
 Pick up (documentary), a 2005 documentary film directed by Lucia Sanchez
 Pick-up (filmmaking), minor shots filmed after the primary filming of a movie to augment what has already been shot

People
 Ronald Pickup (1940–2021), British actor
 Thomas Pickup, rugby league footballer of the 1920s for Wakefield Trinity
 Tim Pickup (1948–2021), Australian rugby league footballer
 Shih-Te (fl. 9th century), a Tang Dynasty Chinese Buddhist poet (literally "Pick-Up" or "Foundling")

Other uses
 Pick-up (gaming), anything that you collect whilst playing a video game
 Pick-Up, a 1955 novel by Charles Willeford
 Pick Up!, a chocolate-dipped snack bar from Bahlsen
 The Pickup, a 2001 novel by Nadine Gordimer

See also
 Pickup artist, a man who is skilled in meeting, attracting, and seducing women
 Pick-up game, a game spontaneously started by a group of players
 Pick-up hockey, an informal type of ice hockey
 Pick-up line, a conversation opener to engage an unfamiliar person for romance or dating